Sissela is a given name. Notable people with the name include:

Sissela Bok (born 1934), Swedish-born philosopher and ethicist
Sissela Benn (born 1980) Swedish actress and comedian
Sissela Kyle (born 1957), Swedish actress and comedian
Sissela Nordling Blanco (born 1988), Swedish politician

See also
Cisséla, a town in Guinea
Sissel, a Norwegian given name

Swedish feminine given names